Sunken Condos is the fourth and most recent solo album from Steely Dan co-founder Donald Fagen, released in October 2012 through Reprise Records. It contains eight new songs and a cover of Isaac Hayes' "Out of the Ghetto". Fagen began recording the album in 2010 and described it as having a lighter feel than his earlier work, rather than being a continuation of his Nightfly trilogy.

On September 17, Rolling Stone posted a full-length preview of the song "I'm Not the Same Without You". The song charted at number 28 on the Billboard Japan Hot 100 in October 2012. The album reached number 23 on the official UK album chart on October 21 and number 12 on the Billboard 200, becoming his highest charting solo album since 1993.

Critical response

The album was listed at No. 25 on Rolling Stones list of the top 50 albums of 2012.  The magazine stated that "the music is deceitfully lush, a snazzy cascade of rock, R&B and swing, with production as costly as a Santa Monica beach house." They also named the song "Weather in My Head" the 21st best song of 2012.

Fagen appeared on Late Show with David Letterman and performed "Weather in My Head" to promote the album.

Track listing
All songs written by Donald Fagen, except where noted

PersonnelMusiciansDonald Fagen – lead vocals , piano , Prophet 5 , Wurlitzer , B3 organ , clavinet , Fender Rhodes , melodica , background vocals 
Harlan Post (alias Donald Fagen) – synth bass 
Michael Leonhart – percussion, trumpet , flugelhorn , mellophone , mellophonium , Fender Rhodes , minimoog , clavinet , L100 organ , M100 organ , Prophet 5 , Wurlitzer , mellotron , B3 organ , Juno 6 , accordion , vibraphone , glockenspiel , background vocals , scream 
Earl Cooke Jr (alias Michael Leonhart) – drums
Jon Herington – guitar , twelve-string guitar , rhythm guitar , solo guitar 
Walt Weiskopf – alto saxophone , tenor saxophone , clarinet 
Charlie Pillow – tenor saxophone , clarinet , bass clarinet , bass flute 
Roger Rosenberg – baritone saxophone , bass clarinet 
Jim Pugh – trombone 
Carolyn Leonhart – background vocals , ad-lib vocals 
Jamie Leonhart – background vocals 
Catherine Russell – background vocals 
Cindy Mizelle – background vocals 
Joe Martin – acoustic bass 
William Galison – harmonica , bass harmonica 
Lincoln Schleifer – bass 
Gary Sieger – guitar 
Larry Campbell – rhythm guitar 
Jay Leonhart – acoustic bass 
Freddie Washington – bass 
Antoine Silverman – violin 
Aaron Heicke – bass flute 
Kurt Rosenwinkel – solo guitar Production'
 Donald Fagen – rhythm arrangements, vocal arrangements, horn arrangements, mixing
 Michael Leonhart – vocal and horn arrangements, engineer, mixing
 Charles Martinez – engineer
 Normyn – assistant engineer
 David Schoenwetter – assistant engineer
 Ted Tuthill – assistant engineer
 Pat Dillett – mixing, additional engineering
 Elliot Scheiner – additional engineering
 Amanda Hirsch – additional Pro Tools engineering
 Jon Silverman – assistant mix engineer
 Scott Hull – mastering

Charts

References

Donald Fagen albums
2012 albums
Albums produced by Donald Fagen
Reprise Records albums